Venus Williams was the defending champion and successfully defended her title by defeating Monica Seles 6–2, 6–4 in the final.

Seeds
The first four seeds received a bye into the second round.

Draw

Finals

Top half

Bottom half

External links
 Official results archive (ITF)
 Official results archive (WTA)

Pilot Pen Tennis - Singles
2000 Pilot Pen Tennis